Lorena Méndez Denis (born 6 November 1968) is a Mexican politician affiliated with the National Regeneration Movement (formerly to the Citizens' Movement). She served as Deputy of the LXII Legislature of the Mexican Congress representing Tabasco. She is the Mayor of Comalcalco since October 2018, for a period of 3 years.

References

1968 births
Living people
Politicians from Tabasco
Women members of the Chamber of Deputies (Mexico)
Citizens' Movement (Mexico) politicians
Morena (political party) politicians
People from Comalcalco
21st-century Mexican politicians
21st-century Mexican women politicians
Deputies of the LXII Legislature of Mexico
Members of the Chamber of Deputies (Mexico) for Tabasco